Podarcis is a genus of lizards in the family Lacertidae. Its members look very similar to lizards of the genus Lacerta, to which they were considered to belong until the 1970s. While similar externally and ecologically, Podarcis form a distinct group differing from Lacerta by the construction of the skull and the hemipenis, and by the processes of the caudal vertebrae. They are commonly known as wall lizards. They are native to Europe and northern Africa, and most species are restricted to the Mediterranean region. Wall lizards diversified and hybridized during the Messinian salinity crisis.  The Italian wall lizard and the common wall lizard have been introduced to North America, where they have become intermediate hosts for some Acuariidae larvae.

Species and subspecies
The genus Podarcis contains the following 26 species which are recognized as being valid. A few of the many recognized subspecies are also listed here.
Bocage's wall lizard, Podarcis bocagei 
Carbonell's wall lizard, Podarcis carbonelli 
Cretan wall lizard, Podarcis cretensis 
Erhard's wall lizard, Podarcis erhardii 
Maltese wall lizard, Podarcis filfolensis 
Skyros wall lizard, Podarcis gaigeae 
Podarcis galerai 
Podarcis guadarramae 
Iberian wall lizard, Podarcis hispanicus 
Crimean wall lizard, Podarcis ionicus 
Pontian wall lizard, Podarcis latastei 
Podarcis levendis 
Lilford's wall lizard, Podarcis lilfordi 
 Ratas Island lizard, Podarcis lilfordi rodriquezi , extinct, 1950
Catalan wall lizard, Podarcis liolepis 
Dalmatian wall lizard, Podarcis melisellensis 
Milos wall lizard, Podarcis milensis 
Common or European wall lizard, Podarcis muralis 
Peloponnese wall lizard, Podarcis peloponnesiacus 
Ibiza wall lizard, Podarcis pityusensis 
Aeolian wall lizard, Podarcis raffonei 
Italian wall lizard, Podarcis siculus 
Santo Stefano lizard, Podarcis siculus sanctistephani , extinct, 1965
Balkan wall lizard, Podarcis tauricus 

Tyrrhenian wall lizard, Podarcis tiliguerta 
Andalusian wall lizard, Podarcis vaucheri 
Podarcis virescens 
Sicilian wall lizard, Podarcis waglerianus 

Nota bene: A binomial authority or trinomial authority in parentheses indicates that the species or subspecies was originally described in a genus other than Podarcis.

References

Further reading
Wagler J (1830). Natürliches System der AMPHIBIEN, mit vorangehender Classification der SÄUGTHIERE und VÖGEL. Ein Beitrag zur vergleichenden Zoologie. Munich, Stuttgart and Tübingen: J.G. Cotta. vi + 354 pp. + one plate. (Podarcis, new genus, p. 155). (in German and Latin).

 
Lizard genera
Taxa named by Johann Georg Wagler